Cruchley Ice Piedmont is an ice piedmont between the east margins of Powell Island and its north–south range of hills, extending  northward from the John Peaks, in the South Orkney Islands. It is a new name applied by the UK Antarctic Place-Names Committee in 1987 that historically derives from James Weddell's map of 1825 on which Powell Island is charted as two islands, the southern one being "Cruchley's Island."

References 

Ice piedmonts of Antarctica
Bodies of ice of the South Orkney Islands